Dəlilər, or Dalilar or Dalular, may refer to:

 Dəlilər, Agsu, Azerbaijan
 Dəlilər, Saatly, Azerbaijan
 Dəlilər, Shamkir, Azerbaijan
 Dalilar, Iran
 Dalular, Ararat Province, Armenia

See also
 Deller (disambiguation)